Bruno Bitkowski (November 11, 1929 – February 10, 1966) was an all-star Canadian football centre for the Ottawa Rough Riders for eleven seasons. Bitkowski was a Grey Cup champion twice (1951 and 1960) and won the Gruen Trophy as best rookie in the Big Four in 1951. The Ottawa Roughriders retired his number (#40).

The Bruno Bitkowski Memorial Trophy was given to the outstanding lineman in the Canadian Inter-university Sport (CIS) Football league and was awarded to the most gentlemanly male athlete, from its inception in 1966 until the award was retired in 1986.

Bruno Bitkowski was appointed as a Naval Cadet (UNTD) in the Royal Canadian Naval Reserve serving with HMCS Hunter for the UNTD (University Naval Training Division) from 1950–51.

Notes

Bio

Canadian football offensive linemen
Ottawa Rough Riders players
Sportspeople from Windsor, Ontario
Players of Canadian football from Ontario
Windsor Lancers football players
1929 births
1966 deaths
Canadian Football League Rookie of the Year Award winners